South Central Los Skanless is the only album by American rap group Kausion. It was released October 10, 1995 through Lench Mob Records. The album peaked at number 37 on the US Billboard Top R&B/Hip-Hop Albums and at number 23 on the Heatseekers Albums charts.

Audio production was mainly handled by the group themselves and Ice Cube, with DJ Crazy Toones providing scratches for the album. Its lead single, "What You Wanna Do?", was later featured on the fictional radio station West Coast Classics in the video game Grand Theft Auto V.

Track listing 

Sample credits
"Grand Theft Auto" contains elements from "Black Female Prostitute Flirts From The Sidewalk" by The Hollywood Edge Sound Effects Library (1990)
"What You Wanna Do?" contains elements from "Aqua Boogie (A Psychoalphadiscobetabioaquadoloop)" by Parliament (1978) and "Theme From the Black Hole" by Parliament (1979)
"O/G's Trippin'" contains elements from "You're a Customer" by EPMD (1988) and "(Not Just) Knee Deep" by Funkadelic (1979)
"Land Of The Skanless" contains elements from "Brother's Gonna Work It Out" by Willie Hutch (1973)
"Sewed Up" contains elements from "Theme From the Black Hole" by Parliament (1979) and "Criminal Minded" by Boogie Down Productions (1987)
"Supersperm" contains elements from "Super Sporm" by Captain Sky (1978) and "If You Think You're Lonely Now" by Bobby Womack (1981)
"Bounce, Rock, Skate" contains elements from "Gimme The Loot" by Notorious B.I.G. (1994)
"Steal at Will" contains elements from "Until You Come Back To Me (That's What I'm Gonna Do)" by Aretha Franklin (1973) and "Robbin' Hood (Cause It Ain't All Good)" by Ice Cube (1994)
"16 Times" contains elements from "I Can Make You Dance" by Zapp (1983)
"If It's Alright" contains elements from "Dusic" by Brick (1977)
"What That South Central Like" contains elements from "Mothership Connection (Star Child)" by Parliament (1975)

Personnel 

 Kausion – lead vocals, producers (tracks 9, 14, 16-17)
 Darrell L. Johnson – vocals (track 8)
 Nanci Fletcher – vocals (tracks 2, 8)
 Natasha Walker – vocals (tracks 2, 8)
 Louis Freese – backing vocals (track 17)
 James "Tre" Rabb – keyboards (tracks 2, 14, 17)
 Stu Marvels – keyboards (tracks 4, 8)
 Lamar Dupré Calhoun - scratches (tracks 2, 9, 11, 14)
 O'Shea Jackson – executive producer, mixing, producer (tracks 2-3, 6, 11, 15-16)
 Stephen Anderson – producer (tracks 4, 8)
 Derrick McDowell – producer (track 12)
 Larry Goodman – producer (track 12)
 Keston E. Wright – mixing

Chart history

References

External links 
 South Central Los Skanless at Discogs
 South Central Los Skanless at MusicBrainz

1995 debut albums
Kausion albums
Albums produced by Bud'da
Albums produced by Laylaw